The Bahmani Sultanate  was a Persianate Sunni Muslim empire of the Deccan in South India. Who were of Turkic origin.It was the first independent Muslim kingdom of the Deccan, and was known for its perpetual wars with its rival Vijayanagara, which would outlast the Sultanate. 

The Sultanate was founded in 1347 by Ala-ud-Din Bahman Shah. It later split into five successor states that were collectively known as the Deccan sultanates.

Origin
Nothing is definitely known about the origin of Hasan Gangu, the founder of the dynasty, but he was probably of humble origin. But the most probably who were of Turkic origin. According to the historian Ferishta, Zafar Khan had earlier been a servant of a Brahmin astrologer at Delhi named Gangu (hence the name Hasan Gangu), and says that he from North India. Historians have not found any corroboration for the legend, but Barani, who was the court chronicler of Sultan Firuz Shah, as well as some other scholars have also called him as Hasan Gangu. Another legend traces the ancestry of Bahmanids to the mythological Persian hero Bahman Shah, which seems implausible. The claim of his descent from this half-mythical hero was an attempt to mark him out for the honour of royalty by later poets and historians, but it was not Hasan Gangu himself who claimed this. According to a third version, Bahman is a corrupted persianized form of Brahman, and Hasan Gangu was a Brahman who became Muslim.

History 

Barani states that Hasan Gangu was "born in very humble circumstances. For the first thirty years of his life he was nothing more than a field laborer." He was made a commander of a hundred horsemen by the Sultan who was pleased with his honesty. This sudden rise in the military and socio-economic ladder was common in this era of Muslim India. 

Zafar Khan was one of the native inhabitants of Dehli who were forced to migrate to the Deccan, with the purpose of building a large Muslim urban centre in Daulatabad. Although the transfer was successful in spreading northern culture to the south, the Muslim nobles had long resented the Sultan for his cruelty in forcing the Muslim population to migrate to his new city of Daulatabad. Zafar Khan was a man of ambition and looked forward to adventure. He had long hoped to employ his body of horsemen in the Deccan region for slaying and plundering Hindus, as the Deccan was seen as the place of bounty in Muslim imagination at the time. He was rewarded with an Iqta for taking part in the conquest of Kampili. He made various raids against neighboring Hindus until he could gain influence and wealth and became a powerful military chief.

Rise 

Before the establishment of his kingdom, he was Governor of Deccan and a commander on behalf of Tughlaq's. On 3 August 1347, the elderly Nazir Uddin Ismail Shah (Ismail Mukh) who had revolted against the Delhi Sultanate, voluntarily stepped down in favour of Bahman Shah, a native of Delhi. His revolt was successful, and he established an independent state on the Deccan within the Delhi Sultanate's southern provinces with its headquarters at Hasanabad (Gulbarga) and all his coins were minted at Hasanabad. The majority of the Bahmanid army that conquered the Deccan consisted of Urdu-speaking Indian Muslims indigenous to North India. With the support of the influential North Indian Chishti Sufi Shaikhs, he was crowned "Alauddin Bahman Shah Sultan – Founder of the Bahmani Dynasty". They bestowed upon him a robe allegedly worn by the Prophet. The extension of the Sufi's notion of spiritual sovereignty lent legitimacy to the planting of the Sultanate's political authority, where the land, people, and produce of the Deccan were merited state protection, no longer available for plunder with impunity. These Sufis legitimized the transplantation of Indo-Muslim rulership from one region in South Asia to another, converting the land of the Bahmanids into being recognized as Dar ul-Islam, while it was previously considered Dar ul-Harb.

Alauddin was succeeded by his son Mohammed Shah I. His conflicts with the Vijayangar empire were singularly savage wars, as according to the historian Ferishta, "the population of the Carnatic was so reduced that it did not recover for several ages." The Bahmanids' aggressive confrontation with the two main Hindu kingdoms of the southern Deccan, Warangal and Vijayanagara, made them renowned among Muslims as warriors of the faith. The Vijayanagara empire and the Bahmanids fought over the control of the Godavari-basin, Tungabadhra Doab, and the Marathwada country, although they seldom required a pretext for declaring war, as military conflicts were almost a regular feature and lasted as long as these kingdoms continued. Military slavery involved captured slaves from Vijayanagara and having them embrace a Deccani identity by converting them to Islam and integrating into the host society, so they could begin military careers within the Bahmanid empire.

Ghiyasuddin succeeded his father Muhammad II at the age of seventeen, but was blinded and imprisoned by a Turkic slave called Taghalchin, who had held a grudge on the Sultan for the latter's refusal to appoint him as a governor. He had lured the Sultan into putting himself in the former's power, using the beauty of his daughter, who was accomplished in music and arts, and had introduced her to the Sultan at a feast. He was succeeded by Shamsuddin, who was a puppet king under Taghalchin. Firuz and Ahmed, the sons of the fourth sultan Daud, marched to Gulbarga to avenge Ghiyasuddin. Firuz declared himself the sultan, and defeated Taghalchin's forces. Taghalchin was killed and Shamsuddin was blinded.

Taj ud-Din Firuz Shah became the sultan in 1397. Firuz Shah fought against the Vijayanagara Empire on many occasions and the rivalry between the two dynasties continued unabated throughout his reign, with victories in 1398 and 1406, but a defeat in 1419. One of his victories resulted in his marriage to Deva Raya's daughter. In his reign, Sufis such as Gesudaraz, a Chishti saint who had immigrated from Dehli to Daulatabad, were prominent in court and daily life. He was the first author to write in the Dakhni dialect of Urdu. The Dakhni language became widespread, practised by various milieus from the court to the Sufis. It was established as a lingua franca of the Muslims of the Deccan, as not only the aspect of a dominant urban elite, but an expression of the regional religious identity.

Firuz Shah was succeeded by his younger brother Ahmad Shah I Wali. Bidar was made capital of the sultanate in 1429. Ahmad Shah's reign was marked with relentless military campaigns and expansionism. He imposed destruction and slaughter on Vijayanagara and finally captured the remnants of Warangal. 

Alauddin Ahmad II succeeded his father to the throne in 1436. He ordered the construction of the Chand Minar. For the first half century after the establishment of the Bahmanids, the original North Indian colonists and their sons had administered the empire quite independent of either the non-Muslim Hindus, or the Muslim foreign immigrants. However, the later Bahmani Sultans, mainly starting from his father Ahmad Shah Wali I, began to recruit foreigners from overseas, whether because of depletion among the ranks of the original settlers, or the feelings of dependency upon the Persian courtly model, or both. This resulted in factional strife that first became acute in the reign of his son Alauddin Ahmad Shah II. In 1446, the powerful Dakhani nobles persuaded the Sultan that the Persians were responsible for the failure of the Konkan invasion. The Sultan condoned a terrible massacre of Persian Shi'a Sayyids by the Sunni Dakhani nobles and their Sunni Abyssinian slaves. A few survivors escaped the massacre dressed in women's clothing and convinced the Sultan of their innocence. Ashamed of his own folly, the Sultan punished the Dakhani leaders who were responsible for the massacre, putting  them to death or throwing them in prison, and reduced their families to beggary. 

The eldest sons of Humayun Shah, Nizam-Ud-Din Ahmad III and Muhammad Shah III Lashkari ascended the throne successively, while they were young boys. The vizier Mahmud Gawan ruled as regent during this period, until Muhammad Shah reached age. Mahmud Gawan is known for setting up the Mahmud Gawan Madrasa, a center of religious as well as secular education. Gawan was considered a great statesman, and a poet of repute. Mahmud Gawan was caught in a struggle between a rivalry between two groups of nobles, the Dakhanis and the Afaqis. The Dakhanis made the ruling indigenous Muslim elite of the Bahmanid dynasty, being descendants of Sunni immigrants from Northern India, while the Afaqis were foreign newcomers from the west such as Gawan, who were mostly Shi'is. The Dakhanis believed that the privileges, patronage and positions of power in the Sultanate should have been reserved solely for them, based on their ethnic origin and their sense of pride of having launched the Bahmanid empire. The divisions included sectarian religious divisions where the Afaqis were looked upon heretics by the Sunnis as the former were Shi'as, while Eaton cites a linguistic divide where the Dakhanis spoke Dakhni while the Afaqis favored the Persian language. Although Mahmud Gawan was a foreigner, he attempted to reconcile the factions and strengthen the Sultanate by allotting offices to the Dakhanis. Nonetheless, Mahmud Gawan found it difficult to win their confidence; the party strife could not be stopped and his opponents eventually managed to poison the ears of the Sultan. Mahmud Gawan was executed by Muhammad Shah III, an act that the latter regretted until he died in 1482. Upon his death, Nizam-ul-Mulk Bahri, the father of the founder of the Nizam Shahi dynasty became the regent of the king. Nizam-ul-Mulk, as leader of the Dakhani party, led a cold-blooded massacre of Iranian Georgians and Turkmens in the capital of Bidar.

Later rulers and decline
Muhammad Shah II was succeeded by his son Mahmood Shah Bahmani II, the last Bahmani ruler to have real power. In 1501, Mahmud Shah Bahmani united his amirs and wazirs in an agreement to wage annual Jihad against Vijayanagara. The expeditions were financially ruinous. 

The last Bahmani Sultans were puppet monarchs under their Barid Shahi Prime Ministers, who were de facto rulers. After 1518 the sultanate broke up into five states: Nizamshahi of Ahmednagar, Qutb Shahi of Golconda (Hyderabad), Barid Shahi of Bidar, Imad Shahi of Berar, Adil Shahi of Bijapur. They are collectively known as the "Deccan Sultanates".

The south Indian Emperor Krishnadevaraya of the Vijayanagara Empire defeated the last remnant of Bahmani Sultanate power after which the Bahmani Sultanate collapsed.

Historiography 
Modern scholars like Sherwani, Eaton have based their accounts of the Bahmani dynasty mainly upon the medieval chronicles of Firishta, and Syed Ali Tabatabai. Other contemporary works were Sivatatva Chintamani and Guru Charitra. Athanasius Nikitin traveled this kingdom. He contrasts the huge "wealth of the nobility with the wretchedness of the peasantry and the frugality of the Hindus".

Culture 
The dynasty derived its Indo-Muslim and Persianate culture from Northern India and the Middle East, and used Urdu/Dakhani and Persian literature to differentiate from its overwhelmingly non-Muslim subjects. According to Khafi Khan and Ferishta, musicians flocked to the court from Lahore, Delhi, Persia and Khorasan.

The Bahmani Sultans were patrons of the Persian language, culture and literature, and some members of the dynasty became well-versed in that language and composed its literature in that language.
 

The first sultan, Alauddin Bahman Shah is noted to have captured 1,000 singing and dancing girls from Hindu temples after he battled the northern Carnatic chieftains. The later Bahmanis also enslaved civilian women and children in wars; many of them were converted to Islam in captivity. The craftspersons of Bidar were so famed for their inlay work on copper and silver that it came to be known as Bidri. Firuz Shah, having a passion for languages, married a large number of Indians of various ethnicities, Georgians, Iranians and Arabs, in order to practise speaking their own languages with them. In addition he was known for speaking several Indian languages.

Architecture 

The Persianate Indo-Islamic style of architecture developed during this period was later adopted by the Deccan Sultanates as well.

The Gulbarga Fort, Haft Gumbaz, and Jama Masjid in Gulbarga, Bidar Fort and Madrasa Mahmud Gawan in Bidar, are the major architectural contributions.

The later rulers are buried in an elaborate tomb complex, known as the Bahmani Tombs. The exterior of one of the tombs is decorated with coloured tiles. Arabic, Persian and Urdu inscriptions are inscribed inside the tombs.

The Bahmani rulers made some beautiful tombs and mosques in Bidar and Gulbarga. They also built many forts at Daulatabad, Golconda and Raichur. The architecture was highly influenced by Persian architecture. They invited architects from Persia, Turkey and Arabia. Some of the magnificent structures built by the Bahmanis were the Jami Masjid at Gulbarga, Chandand Minar and the Mahmud Gawan Madrasa at Bidar.

List of Bahmani Shahs

See also 

 Deccan sultanates

References

Sources

External links 

 
 Library of Congress – A Country Study: India

 
1527 disestablishments in India
States and territories established in 1347
States and territories disestablished in 1527
1347 establishments in Asia
14th-century establishments in India
Former sultanates